The Association for Theatre in Higher Education (ATHE) is a United States-based non-profit membership organization whose mission is "To support and advance the study and practice of theatre and performance in higher education." It publishes Theatre Journal and Theatre Topics, has 23 special interest focus groups, runs a job bank service for its members, and organises an annual conference attended by around 800 people.

References

External links

Women and Theatre Program records at the Sophia Smith Collection, Smith College Special Collections

Performing arts education in the United States
Educational organizations based in the United States
Arts organizations based in Saint Paul, Minnesota